The Batten Institute for entrepreneurship and innovation is one of the Centers of Excellence at the University of Virginia's Darden Graduate School of Business Administration.  It was founded in 1999 with a $60 million gift to the Darden School from alumnus Frank Batten, chairman of Landmark Communications, founder of The Weather Channel.

Mission 

The Batten Institute serves as a catalyst for developing entrepreneurial leaders and for advancing knowledge about the transformative power of entrepreneurship and innovation. To fulfill this mission, the institute pursues objectives in these areas: inspired education, transformative research, innovation lab and community engagement.

The Institute publishes a series of white papers, Batten Briefings, on entrepreneurship and innovation topics.

The Executive Director of the Institute is Sean Carr, Assistant Professor of Business Administration at the Darden School.

Programs and events

The Batten Institute operates the W.L. Lyons Brown III Innovation Lab at the University of Virginia, located at the Darden School of Business. Through this lab, the institute hosts a business incubator program for University of Virginia students and members of the local community. Additional entrepreneurship programs and events are hosted at the lab through the year.

In partnership with other schools at the University of Virginia, the Batten Institute sponsors the University of Virginia Entrepreneurship Cup series of three annual competitions which educate students across the University on entrepreneurial methods.

The Batten Institute Fellows Program brings prominent and high-potential thought leaders to the Darden School of Business for short and long-term visits.

References

External links
 The University of Virginia
 The Darden School of Business
 The Batten Institute

Business schools in Virginia